A research assistant (RA)  is a researcher employed, often on a temporary contract, by a university, a research institute or a privately held organization, for the purpose of assisting in academic or private research. Research assistants are not independent and are responsible to a supervisor or principal investigator and usually are not directly responsible for the outcome of the research. However, in some countries, research assistants can be the main contributor to the outcome of the research. Research assistants are often educated to degree level and might be enrolled in a postgraduate degree  program and simultaneously teach, for example, if enrolled in a PhD programme they are known as Doctoral Research Assistants.

Undergraduate and post-doctoral level
Although a research assistant is normally appointed at graduate level, undergraduates are also sometimes appointed to support research. In Economics and Business, for instance, numerous research assistantship opportunities are available to students who graduated from college. Such (paid) research assistantship positions normally last between one and two years and are becoming increasingly common experience before applying to PhD programs in Economics and Business. Applications to such research assistantship positions normally take place in the Fall quarter of the senior year. 

Similarly, someone who has recently been awarded a doctoral degree may hold a temporary appointment as a postdoctoral research assistant.

Clinical research assistant

A clinical research assistant or clinical research associate is employed by a hospital or medical research centre, who is involved in the administration of clinical trials.  They may assist a senior investigator with recruiting and enrolling research subjects, as well as with correspondence and grant applications.

See also
 Academic freedom
 Graduate student
 Research associate
 Researcher

References

Academic administration
Education and training occupations